Kenneth Harden Scott (11 April 1926 – 2 July 2012) was an Australian rules footballer who played with Footscray in the Victorian Football League (VFL).

Notes

External links 		

Australian rules footballers from Victoria (Australia)
Western Bulldogs players
Braybrook Football Club players
1926 births
2012 deaths